The Musée de la civilisation, often directly translated in English-language media outside Quebec as the Museum of Civilization, is a museum located in Quebec City, Quebec, Canada. It is situated in the historic Old Quebec area near the Saint Lawrence River. It was designed by architect Moshe Safdie, and opened its doors to the public on 19 October 1988.

The previous buildings of the Banque de Paris and the Maison Estèbe, which were situated on Saint-Pierre street, were integrated in the museum's structure. Permanent and temporary exhibitions are held at the museum, usually related to humanities, and virtual exhibitions are also available.  The institution also hosts Quartier des découvertes (Discovery Zone), geared towards children, and offers other services such as guided visits, a French America reference centre, shows, souvenir boutiques, a cafeteria, and a leisure room.

Images

Human Remains Controversy 
During the spring of 2021, The Globe and Mail published an article by journalist Kate Taylor about research concerning the museum's large collection of human remains. This collection, on long-term loan from the provincial Ministry of Public Security, includes more than one hundred body parts—such as tattooed skin from a twenty-nine-year old homicide victim named Mildred Brown—taken from the bodies of murder victims by Dr. Wilfrid Derome during the early twentieth century.

Exhibitions
 Territoires (Territories)
 Le Temps des Québécois (People of Québec ... then and Now)
 Nous, les premières nations (Encounter with the First Nations)

Affiliations
The Museum is affiliated with: the Canadian Museums Association, the Canadian Heritage Information Network, and the Virtual Museum of Canada.

See also 
Culture of Quebec
List of museums in Quebec
Musée de l'Amérique française
Canadian Museum of Civilization in Hull, Quebec

References

External links

 Official website (English language)
 Musée de la civilisation, Museums to Discover

Museums in Quebec City
Old Quebec
History museums in Quebec
Moshe Safdie buildings
Museums established in 1984
1984 establishments in Quebec